Forbury Gardens is a public park in the town of Reading in the English county of Berkshire. The park is on the site of the outer court of Reading Abbey, which was in front of the Abbey Church. The site was formerly known as the Forbury, and one of the roads flanking the current gardens is still known as The Forbury. Fairs were held on the site three times a year until the 19th century.

The gardens are listed as Grade II in the English Heritage Register of Historic Parks and Gardens.

Forbury, a suburb of the New Zealand city of Dunedin, was named after the gardens by early resident William Henry Valpy, who was born in Reading.

History

Early years
Reading Abbey was founded in 1121, by Henry I, and for the next four centuries it dominated the town, becoming one of the most influential establishments in England. Like other such monasteries, Reading had a forbury, or 'borough in front', an area of open land which provided a meeting place between the Abbey and the town. The Forbury in Reading was part of the outer court of the Abbey, and provided a market place as well as a meeting place.

In 1150, what is now Forbury Hill was constructed to help fortify the Abbey during the civil war between King Henry I's daughter Matilda and his nephew Stephen.

The abbey was largely destroyed in 1538 during Henry VIII's Dissolution of the Monasteries. The last abbot, Hugh Cook Faringdon, was tried and convicted of high treason, and hanged, drawn and quartered in front of the Abbey Church. After this, the buildings of the abbey were extensively looted, with lead, glass and facing stones removed for reuse elsewhere, and the focus of the town moved away from the Forbury.

Reading suffered badly during the English Civil War, being occupied at different times by both sides. During the Siege of Reading (1642–43), the Royalist garrison built defences that further damaged the remains of the Abbey, and Forbury Hill was used as a gun emplacement.

As a result of the concerns sparked in England by the French Revolution, and throughout the ensuing Napoleonic Wars, the Forbury was used for military drills and parades, in addition to its well-established use for fairs and circuses. Three annual fairs were generally held on the Forbury, but the most significant was the Michaelmas Fair, held in September. This fair became known as the Reading Cheese Fair, although cattle, horses and hops were also sold, and it served as the principal local hiring fair.

19th century
By the first years of the 19th century, the western part of the Forbury was in use as a playground or sports ground for Reading School, which at this time was housed in the former Hospitium of St John. However the whole of the Forbury was in private ownership, and disputes were common as to the common rights of the town and the rights of the school.

In 1854, Forbury Hill and the eastern section of the present gardens were sold to Reading Corporation at the cost of £1200, of which £400 was donated by the previous owner, a Mr Wheble. The resulting gardens were planned with a 'botanical character', a fountain and a summer house, and became known as the Pleasure Gardens. Work started in 1855 and the Pleasure Gardens opened on Easter Sunday 1856. A tunnel was built on the eastern side in 1859 to link the gardens and the Abbey ruins.

The success of the Pleasure Gardens contrasted with the situation in the western part of the Forbury, which was still used for fairs. After one fair, the area was described as being covered 'with heaps of oyster shells, manure and other refuse'. In 1860, this section of the Forbury was purchased by the town for £6010 from Colonel Blagrave. It was decided that fairs should no longer be held there, but the emphasis remained on recreational use rather than botanical display, with the area grassed except for the outside walks and a gravelled parade ground.

The common ownership notwithstanding, the two halves of the Forbury remained very different in character, and separated by a wall. However in 1869 the town purchased  of King's Meadow, the abbey's former water meadow by the River Thames, as a recreation ground. This paved the way for the incorporation, in 1873, of the western part of the Forbury into the gardens, which then became known as Forbury Gardens.

The Maiwand Lion statue was erected in 1886 to commemorate the loss of 286 soldiers (though the exact number varies by account) from the 66th Royal Berkshire Regiment at the Battle of Maiwand in Afghanistan on 27 July 1880. The sculptor of this 31-foot statue was George Blackall Simonds and it was unveiled in December 1886.  It is sometimes known locally as the Forbury Lion.

A cross memorializing Henry I was put up, at about the same time as the Maiwand Lion, on the north-west corner of the footings of the Abbey Church. The Victoria Gates on the southern side of the gardens commemorate Queen Victoria's Diamond Jubilee in 1897.

21st century
In 2015, a statue was unveiled to the memory of Trooper Fred Potts VC, who was awarded the Victoria Cross in October 1915 after endangering his own life to drag a wounded comrade from the battlefield at the Battle of Scimitar Hill. The statue is just outside the garden wall, facing the Crown Court building. In the same year, the Reading International Brigade Memorial was relocated from the Civic Centre to the east side of the gardens, and rededicated.

On 20 June 2020, three people were killed and three others seriously injured in a mass stabbing at the Forbury Gardens. The incident is being treated as a terrorist incident.

The gardens today

A grand re-opening event took place on 14 May 2005 to mark the completion of a one-year restoration project. The Heritage Lottery Fund awarded Reading Borough Council £2.13 million to restore the historic features of the Forbury Gardens and improve safety and access for visitors. The scheme was developed in consultation with residents and interested local groups.

Work in the gardens themselves has included the restoration of the Maiwand Lion, the bandstand, water feature and the garden's walls, fencing and gateways. A new Keeper's Lodge also includes a refreshment kiosk, public toilets and facilities for a resident gardener. Reading Borough Council organises summer concerts in the bandstand on Sunday afternoons during July and August.

After the restoration, closed-circuit cameras monitor the whole Gardens area, in a bid to deter drug use and anti-social behaviour. The garden has received a Green Flag Award for being welcoming, safe, well maintained and involving the community.

The Forbury Hill is now accessible by two winding footpaths (wheelchair-accessible) that lead to an area that is elevated about 3 metres above the surrounding gardens. A single plane tree stands in the middle, and around the outer edge of the top of the hill are wooden seats.

References

External links

 Video: History of Reading Abbey, BBC
 Berkshire History: Reading Abbey
 World War One Battle of Verdun oak and chestnut trees traced – Oak in Forbury Gardens, BBC

Gardens in Berkshire
Grade II listed parks and gardens in Berkshire
Parks and open spaces in Reading, Berkshire
1856 establishments in England